Arizona to Broadway is a 1933 American pre-Code crime romance film directed by James Tinling and starring James Dunn and Joan Bennett. It was made by Fox Film Corporation. The screenplay was written by William M. Conselman and Henry Johnson.

It was reworked ten years later into Jitterbugs, one of Laurel and Hardy's features made at 20th Century Fox in the 1940s.

Cast
(in credits order)

 James Dunn as Smiley Wells
 Joan Bennett as Lynn Martin
 Herbert Mundin as Kingfish Miller
 Sammy Cohen as Morris Blitz
 Theodore von Eltz as Hubert Wayne
 Merna Kennedy as Flo Sandberg
 Earle Foxe as John Sandburg
 Dave Wengren as Ambrose
 J. Carrol Naish as Tommy Monk
 Max Wagner as Pete
 Walter Catlett as Ned Flynn
 Jerry Lester as Jimmy Dante
 Gene Malin as Ray Best (uncredited)

References

External links
 
 
 

1933 films
1930s crime films
1930s romance films
Fox Film films
American crime films
American romance films
American black-and-white films
Films set in Arizona
Films set in New Orleans
Films set in New York City
Films scored by Arthur Lange
Films directed by James Tinling
Romantic crime films
1930s English-language films
1930s American films